The Malibu-Newton Canyon Valley AVA is an American Viticultural Area in Los Angeles County, California. George Rosenthal planted the first vineyards planted in the area since Prohibition in 1987, and was successful in his petition for the creation of the AVA in 1996. Coastal fog and wind can influence the microclimate of the canyon, providing a cooler climate than the surrounding areas.

References 

American Viticultural Areas of California
Geography of Los Angeles County, California
Santa Monica Mountains
American Viticultural Areas of Southern California
American Viticultural Areas
1996 establishments in California